Dream Hunting in the Valley of the In-Between is the sixth studio album by American band Man Man. It was released on May 1, 2020 under Sub Pop.

Critical reception
Dream Hunting in the Valley of the In-Between was met with generally favorable reviews from critics. At Metacritic, which assigns a weighted average rating out of 100 to reviews from mainstream publications, this release received an average score of 77, based on 5 reviews.

Track listing

References

2020 albums
Man Man albums
Sub Pop albums